The Chaires-Capitola Volunteer Fire Department is an all volunteer fire department located in eastern Leon County, Florida. The department is under the administrative oversight and medical direction of Leon County Emergency Medical Services and contracts with the Tallahassee Fire Department for mutual-aid to emergencies outside of the city limits.

The fire department has two stations, one in the immediate vicinity of Chaires Elementary School and the Dorothy Cooper Spence Community Center on Chaires Cross Road. This station (#12) is shared with the Tallahassee Fire Department and Leon County Emergency Medical Service, who each provide 24 hour coverage to the area from this location. The second Chaires-Capitola VFD station is located near the intersection of Williams Road and Louvinia Drive.

References

Leon County, Florida
Fire departments in Florida